Ronald Scott-Miller (1 November 1904 – 10 March 1992) was a  Conservative Party politician in the United Kingdom. He was Member of Parliament (MP) for the King's Lynn constituency in Norfolk from 1951 until he retired from the House of Commons at the 1959 general election.

He was educated at Aldro, Eastbourne and Uppingham School.

References 
 Richard Kimber's political science resources: UK General Elections since 1832

External links 
 

1904 births
1992 deaths
People educated at Aldro
People educated at Uppingham School
Conservative Party (UK) MPs for English constituencies
UK MPs 1951–1955
UK MPs 1955–1959